Julie D. Fisher is an American diplomat who has served as the United States ambassador to Cyprus since February 2023. She previously served as the United States ambassador to Belarus from 2020 to 2022.

Early life and education
Fisher earned her Bachelor of Arts in Russian and East European studies from the University of North Carolina at Chapel Hill and a Master of Public Policy from the School of Public and International Affairs at Princeton University.

Career
Fisher is a career member of the Senior Foreign Service, with the rank of minister-counselor. She previously served as deputy assistant secretary of state for Western Europe and the EU in the Bureau of European and Eurasian Affairs. Before that, she was the deputy permanent representative of the U.S. Mission to NATO leading preparations for the 2018 Brussels Summit and the move to the new NATO HQ.  She was the chief of staff to the deputy secretary of state for management and resources supporting reform efforts involving knowledge management, human resources and security at U.S. facilities abroad.  Prior to that, Ambassador Fisher served as the director of the State Department's Operations Center, the 24/7 team that facilitates communications for the Secretary of State, department principals and colleagues around the globe; the Operations Center also hosts the department's task forces and crisis response teams.

From 2011–2013, in support of the NATO Secretary-General, Ambassador Fisher was detailed to NATO's international staff as deputy director of the Private Office. She has served in assignments at U.S. embassies in Tbilisi, Georgia; Kyiv, Ukraine; and Moscow, Russia, as well as tours at the National Security Council, the bureaus for European Affairs and Near Eastern Affairs, and as a member of the Secretary of State's Executive Secretariat Staff.

United States ambassador to Belarus
On April 20, 2020, President Donald Trump nominated Fisher to be the United States ambassador to Belarus. Hearings on her nomination were held before the Senate Foreign Relations Committee on August 5, 2020. The committee favorably reported her nomination to the Senate floor on September 22, 2020. Fisher was confirmed by the Senate on December 15, 2020, via voice vote, Fisher became the first U.S. ambassador to Belarus since 2008. She was denied a visa by Belarusian authorities and she relocated to Lithuania as a U.S. special envoy for Belarus in October 2021. On June 9, 2022, Fisher announced that her tenure would be coming to an end.

United States ambassador to Cyprus
On June 15, 2022, President Joe Biden announced Fisher's nomination to be the next ambassador to Cyprus. On November 30, 2022, hearings on her nomination were held before the Senate Foreign Relations Committee. The committee favorably reported her nomination to the Senate on December 7, 2022. The  Senate confirmed her nomination on December 13, 2022 via voice vote. She was sworn in by Acting Deputy Secretary John R. Bass on February 1, 2023, and presented her credentials to President Nicos Anastasiades on February 21, 2023.

Personal life
Fisher speaks Russian, French, and Georgian.

References

External links

Living people
Ambassadors of the United States to Belarus
Ambassadors of the United States to Cyprus
United States Department of State officials
American women ambassadors
University of North Carolina at Chapel Hill alumni
Princeton School of Public and International Affairs alumni
21st-century American diplomats
Year of birth missing (living people)
Place of birth missing (living people)
American women diplomats